Alex Fitzpatrick (born 2 January 1999) is an English professional golfer. He is the younger brother of 2022 U.S. Open champion Matt Fitzpatrick.

Amateur career
In 2018, Fitzpatrick reached the final of the Spanish International Amateur Championship at La Manga, losing 3 and 2 to fellow countryman Billy McKenzie. The same year Fitzpatrick reached the quarterfinals of the 2018 U.S. Amateur. 

Fitzpatrick played college golf from 2018 to 2022 at Wake Forest University in North Carolina. He made his PGA Tour debut as an amateur at the 2022 Valspar Championship at Innisbrook Resort, Palm Harbor, Florida, being invited after winning the 2021 Valspar Collegiate.

He represented England at the 2019 European Amateur Team Championship at Ljunghusen Golf Club in Sweden, finishing tied 4th individually in the stroke-play competition and earning a silver medal with his team since they lost in the final against host nation Sweden. He also played in the 2019 and 2021 Walker Cup. His best ranking on the World Amateur Golf Ranking was 4th.

Professional career
Fitzpatrick turned professional in June 2022 and became an affiliate member of the European Tour. He made his professional debut at the 2022 Horizon Irish Open.

In August 2022, Fitzpatrick played five tournaments on the PGA Tour Canada, with a best finish of tied 11th at the Ontario Open.

He made the cut in his next four tournaments on the European Tour, earning a total of 129,014 €, with a best finish of tied 13th at the 2022 Cazoo Open de France in September.

Amateur wins
2017 Yorkshire Amateur Match Play Championship
2020 Golf Club of Georgia Amateur Championship
2021 Valspar Collegiate, Old Town Club Collegiate
Source:

Team appearances
Amateur
Boys Home Internationals (representing England): 2016, 2017 (winners)
Jacques Léglise Trophy (representing Great Britain & Ireland): 2016, 2017
European Amateur Team Championship (representing England): 2019
Walker Cup (representing Great Britain & Ireland): 2019, 2021
Arnold Palmer Cup (representing International team): 2020 (winners), 2021
Sources:

References

External links

English male golfers
Wake Forest Demon Deacons men's golfers
European Tour golfers
Sportspeople from Sheffield
People educated at Tapton School
1999 births
Living people